XI Corps was a corps-sized formation of the British Expeditionary Force, active during the First World War that served on the Western Front and in Italy. It was recreated as part of Home Forces defending the United Kingdom during the Second World War.

First World War

Western Front
XI Corps was formed in France on 29 August 1915 under Lt-Gen Richard Haking. Its first serious engagement (as part of Sir Charles Monro's First Army) was the Battle of Fromelles (19 July 1916), a diversion to the Somme offensive in which two untried divisions were launched into an ill-planned subsidiary attack in Flanders. It achieved nothing but cost thousands of casualties, and caused great resentment in Australia.

Order of Battle at Fromelles
General Officer Commanding Lt-Gen R. Haking
 61st (2nd South Midland) Division
 5th Australian Division

Italian Front
XI Corps was one of two corps HQs moved to the Italian Front in November 1917.

Order of Battle in Italy 1 December 1917
GOC Lt-Gen Sir Richard Haking

Corps Troops:
 1/1st King Edward's Horse
 HQ Corps Heavy Artillery Royal Garrison Artillery (RGA)
 11th Cyclist Battalion Army Cyclist Corps
 Corps Topographical Section Royal Engineers (RE)
 Signal Troops RE (L Corps Signal Company; 27 (Motor) Airline Section; R and LC Cable Sections, *Corps Heavy Artillery Signal Section RGA)
 Corps Siege Park Army Service Corps (ASC)
 Corps Ammunition Park (345 (MT) Company (25 Ammunition Sub-Park) ASC)
 491 (MT) Company ASC, attached Corps Heavy Artillery
 5th (Light) Mobile Workshop Army Ordnance Corps (AOC)
 Area Employment Company
 Corps School

Return to the Western Front
XI Corps returned to the Western Front in March 1918 in time to take part in the defence against the German spring offensive (the Battle of the Lys) and the final battles of the war as part of Sir William Birdwood's Fifth Army.

Order of Battle 27 September 1918

Corps Headquarters Command Staff 

 GOC Lt-Gen Sir Richard Haking
 Brigadier-General, General Staff: Brig-Gen J.E.S. Brind
 Deputy Adjutant & Quartermaster-General: Brig.-Gen A.F.U. Green
 Assistant Director Ordnance Services, Lt Col A.J. Herbert, NZAOC
 Commander, Royal Artillery: Brig-Gen S.F. Metcalfe
 Commander, Heavy Artillery: Brig-Gen F.A. Twiss
 Commander, Engineers: Brig-Gen H.J.M. Marshall

Divisions attached to XI Corps 

 19th (Western) Division (to Third Army 4 October)
 47th (1/2nd London) Division (to III Corps 13 October)
 57th (2nd West Lancashire) Division (from Third Army 11 October)
 59th (2nd North Midland) Division
 61st (2nd South Midland) Division (to Third Army 5 October)
 74th (Yeomanry) Division (from Fourth Army 2 October; to III Corps 8 October)

Second World War
XI Corps was reformed in the United Kingdom early in the Second World War. It was based at Bishop's Stortford in Hertfordshire with a major operational base at Felsted School.

Order of Battle Autumn 1940

 15th (Scottish) Infantry Division
 55th (West Lancashire) Infantry Division
 Royal Artillery
 147th (Essex Yeomanry) Regiment, Royal Horse Artillery 
 72nd Medium Regiment

General Officers Commanding
Commanders included:
 29 August – 4 September 1915 Major-General the Earl of Cavan (temporary)
 4 September 1915 – 13 August 1916 Lieutenant-General Richard Haking
 13 August – 30 September 1916 Lieutenant-General Sir Charles Anderson
 30 September 1916 – 1919 Lieutenant-General Sir Richard Haking
 July 1940 – November 1941 Lieutenant-General Hugh Massy
 November 1941 – March 1942 Lieutenant-General Noel Irwin
 March 1942 – September 1942 Lieutenant-General John Crocker
 September 1942 – April 1943 Lieutenant-General Gerard Bucknall
 April 1943 – July 1943 Lieutenant-General Gerald Templer

Notes

References
 
 Official History 1918: Brigadier-General Sir James E. Edmonds, Military Operations France and Belgium, 1918 Volume V: 26 September–11 November: The Advance to Victory 1947 (reprint Imperial War Museum, 1992)

Further reading

External sources
The Long Long Trail
Royal Artillery 1939-45

British field corps
Corps of the British Army in World War I
Corps of the British Army in World War II
Military units and formations of the British Empire in World War II